Sangley Point Airport (Chavacano: Aeropuerto de Punta Sangley;), also referred to as Cavite Airport, is a domestic airport at Sangley Point, Cavite City in the Philippines primarily serving general aviation and turbo-propped airliners in the general vicinity of South Luzon and the Greater Manila Area.

Currently a domestic airport, it will be later upgraded to an international airport adjacent to Danilo Atienza Air Base and will be served with either P2P buses or a ferry from SM Mall of Asia. It is the fourth commercial airport to serve the Greater Manila Area, complementing and helping to decongest its neighboring Ninoy Aquino International Airport.

History

Early proposals 
In 2013, the All-Asia Resources and Reclamation Corporation (ARRC) — a venture headed by tycoon Henry Sy — commissioned Danish construction firm Rambøll Group A.S. to conduct a feasibility study for the reclamation of 50 hectares off Sangley Point and the development of an airport with two runways and a terminal capable of handling 50 million passengers annually in place of the current air base. This was part of the so-called "Philippines Global Gateway" project proposed by the ARRC to the Philippine government in February 2016. The entire ARRC project involves the construction of an airport and seaport facility, as well as an industrial complex (ecozone), on land reclaimed from Manila Bay off Sangley Point; it is estimated to cost US$50 billion, involving among other things the reclamation of a total of 2,500 hectares of land and the construction of either an underwater tunnel to the SM Mall of Asia complex in Pasay or an extension of the Manila-Cavite Expressway to connect the project to Metro Manila.

Construction of domestic airport 
In December 2016, the ARRC also proposed to the Duterte administration a plan to develop the existing Danilo Atienza Air Base and its 2.4 km long runway into a facility for low-cost carriers and general aviation "while waiting for the new airport." This proposal involves the construction of a 3.3-billion airport terminal. The air base's proposed conversion into a civil airport, if realized under this plan, is expected to reduce air traffic movements at Ninoy Aquino International Airport (NAIA) by 20%.

Amid the increasing congestion and flight delays in NAIA, then-President Rodrigo Duterte ordered in June 2019 the transfer of domestic and general aviation operations to Sangley. The DOTr said it was just awaiting the construction of a passenger terminal building, hangars, a new tower, night operations equipment, and asphalt overlay of its existing 2,300-meter runway. Nevertheless, the President directed the operations in Sangley Point to start immediately and specifically gave a November deadline of the same year.

By October 27, 2019, Sangley had its operational dry run, in which transportation Secretary Arthur Tugade called "a success". The same day also welcomed its first arrival, a Cebu Pacific Cargo turboprop plane. The domestic airport was officially inaugurated on February 15, 2020 by then-President Rodrigo Duterte.

Redevelopment into international airport 
The bidding for the redevelopment of the airport was opened on December 17, 2019. The sole bidder consisting of a consortium of China Communications Construction Company and MacroAsia Corporation was awarded the contract on February 12, 2020, but the contract was terminated in January 2021 due to various deficiencies of the submission of requirements of the consortium.

Bidding was reopened in February 2021, but failed in October after no bids were submitted. In November 2021, the SPIA Development Consortium submitted an unsolicited proposal. The consortium, led by Cavitex Holdings Inc. and Yuchengco Group of Companies, is composed of MacroAsia Corporation, Samsung C&T Corporation of South Korea, Munich Airport International GmbH (the management services arm of Munich Airport), and the London-based Arup Group. The consortium was granted the original proponent status in January 2022, and was awarded the contract on September 15 after successfully overcoming the Swiss challenge set by the provincial government.

The first phase of the project would involve the construction of the first of four runways. The airport would initially have a capacity of 25 million passengers annually, with plans to construct a second runway and expand capacity to 75 million passengers annually.

Airlines and destinations

Passenger

See also 
 Danilo Atienza Air Base
 List of airports in the Greater Manila Area
 Clark International Airport
 Ninoy Aquino International Airport
 New Manila International Airport

References 

2020 establishments in the Philippines
Airports established in 2020
Airports in the Philippines
Buildings and structures in Cavite City
Transportation in Cavite